"Suffocating Under Words of Sorrow (What Can I Do)" is the second single from Welsh heavy metal band Bullet for My Valentine, from their debut album, The Poison. It was released on 19 September 2005 through Visible Noise Records in the United Kingdom. It broke the top 40 for the band in the UK, peaking at number 37 on the UK Singles Chart. The song also peaked at number 2 on the UK Rock Chart.

The single was released in three formats, one CD and two 7" LP's. Two of the three formats featured one live song from their debut album, The Poison.

The song also appears on the soundtrack of Saw III. A music video was released for the song and was directed by Miha Knific.

Track listing

Personnel
Matthew "Matt" Tuck – vocals, guitar
Michael "Padge" Paget – guitar
Michael "Moose" Thomas – drums
Jason "Jay" James – bass, backing vocals

Charts

References

External links
Official Music Video on YouTube

Bullet for My Valentine songs
2005 songs
2005 singles
Songs written by Matthew Tuck
Songs written by Michael Paget
Songs written by Jason James (musician)